Calera is one of the 58 municipalities in the Mexican state of Zacatecas. It is located on the central part of the state of Zacatecas and it is bounded by the municipalities of General Enrique Estrada, Fresnillo, Villa de Cos, Pánuco, Morelos and Zacatecas. The municipality makes up for 0.5% of the area of the state of Zacatecas.

History
Calera was born as a point of pass from Fresnillo and Zacatecas. It was named in honor of the hero of independence Víctor Rosales.

Climate

General information
Calera is one of the fastest-growing cities in Zacatecas Mx., with more than 38,189 people. It is the only municipality in Zacatecas that has an International Airport, Freeway and Railroad. Calera is the most important industrial area in Zacatecas, making floors. wood furniture, juice, purified water, dry chili processing and seeds. Calera is also home to Corona, the largest brewer in Latin America. 97% of Calera's population is Roman Catholic and 3% is Protestant.

Calera was decreed as a municipality by the recommendation of Benito Juárez; he went through these lands when he was fighting for the Republic. It was in Calera that Pancho Villa slept and planned the taking of Zacatecas (Toma de Zacatecas).

Population
In the 2005 census, Apulco reported a population of 36,106. Of these, 29,626 lived in the municipal seat and the remainder lived in surrounding rural communities.

References

https://web.archive.org/web/20110722222931/http://www.calera.mx/s/239

Municipalities of Zacatecas